Maimoona Sultan (1932–2006) was a member of the Parliament of India and belonged to the Indian National Congress. She was elected to the second and third Lok Sabha from Bhopal. She was member of the Rajya Sabha from  April 1974 to April 1980 and from June 1980 to June 1986.

References

1932 births
2006 deaths
Lok Sabha members from Madhya Pradesh
Politicians from Bhopal
Indian Muslims
Rajya Sabha members from Madhya Pradesh
India MPs 1957–1962
India MPs 1962–1967
Indian National Congress politicians from Madhya Pradesh